TUI Sverige is a Swedish travel operator and subsidiary of TUI Group.

The company was previously known as Fritidsresor, meaning 'leisure travel', but was rebranded in October 2016. This was also the case with other TUI tour operators and airlines.

Products
TUI offers package holidays and charter flights with its sister airline, TUI fly Nordic. The company offers holidays across the world, the main destinations being Spain, the Canary Islands, North Africa and Thailand.

History
The company was founded in 1961 by Bengt Bengtsson and his colleague Håkan Hellström, as Fritidsresor. The first destinations offered by Fritidsresor were to the United States later that year. In 1962, holidays to Sitges on the Costa Dorada in Spain, followed by Arma di Taggia and Rimini in Italy were launched.

In 1967, the Danish subsidiary of the company, Fritidsrejser, was launched. Norwegian company Norske Star Tour and Fritidsresor were merged, forming the group Fritidsresegruppen in 1980.

In 1991, Fritidsresegruppen bought 30% of Team Stirling - Falke Rejser, Sol-Rejser and Fritidsrejser, and in 1996, these three companies operated under the name Star Tour. Preussag AG then bought Fritidsresegruppen in 2000.

Advertisements
In 2008, the company used Billy Paul's cover of the Elton John song, Your Song.
In 2016, the company used Leona Lewis' cover of Your Song.

References

Travel and holiday companies of Sweden
TUI Group
Hospitality companies established in 1961
Swedish companies established in 1961
Companies based in Stockholm